The PyraMMMid is a 2011 Russian crime drama directed by Eldar Salavatov. The plot is based on the partially biographical story "Pyramid" by Sergei Mavrodi.

Plot
Russia, early 1990s. Sergei Mamontov is looking for where to apply himself and his intellect. And so he orders a mock-up of a security paper with imperial script, rich ornament, watermarks and his own portrait in the center.

An active advertising campaign begins. A little more than two weeks is enough to make people line up for the "mamontovs" ("mamontovki" in Russian). Powerful bankers and state structures are in confusion – no one has a clue how to stop it, and the MMM has already accumulated more than 10 million investors.

Furthermore, Mamontov is concerned that there are no rich people in the country, and all Soviet industry is exposed to privatization. He accumulates "private greeds" and decides to carry out an honest privatization. His way is blocked by the agent of Western imperialism - Belyavsky (an allusion to Boris Berezovsky) with his MegaVAZ-bank (an allusion to LogoVAZ). Belyavsky comes from the top - he makes connections in the Kremlin and is in charge of television. Belyavsky proposes to share Russia. Mamontov refuses: "I do not trade with Russia!", which attracts the financial inspectorate, who, without checking documents, imposes unthinkable demands for paying taxes upon him, which Mamontov executes. There is still enough money to ruin the bank of Belyavsky. In the country by that time are already 20 million investors and every week the number increases by a million, the "mamontov's" goes on par with ruble. Mamontov threatens to seize power with the help of investors who are facing ruin. During a one-minute audience with the President, Mamontov appears as a guardian for the state amid a corrupt environment and asks for a change in the law - to allow foreigners to be involved in their financial system in order to subordinate the Western oligarchy and thereby make Boris Yeltsin's Russia leader of the world. But Belyavsky begins to threaten the life of Mamontov's daughter and he eventually falls into a trap. On the Ostankino Tower, the battered Mamontov again refuses to cooperate with Belyavsky, despite the proposed opportunity to become the "head of state". Mamontov hopes to leave with his daughter, defending himself by having a recording of a conversation with a representative of the FCS (where he offered similar "privileges"), from his assistant Vera, but she, escaping from the people of Belyavsky, drops the recording in a park and on charges of non-payment of taxes, Mamontov gets in prison and comes out after 7 years.

Cast
Aleksei Serebryakov – Sergey Mamontov
Fyodor Bondarchuk – Belyavsky
Pyotr Fyodorov – Anton
Ekaterina Vilkova – Vera
Anastasia Richie – Button
Nikita Salopin – Zotik
Sergey Koltakov – Prime Minister
Yuri Tsurilo – General
Oleksiy Gorbunov – Colonel
Artyom Mikhalkov – major
Igor Yatsko – Rezo
Daniil Spivakovsky – Gutov
Anna Mikhalkova  – wife of Mamontov
Vladimir Permyakov – Lyonya Golubkov (cameo)
Bogdan Titomir – cameo

See also
Sergei Mavrodi
MMM

References

External links

Films about con artists
Russian crime drama films
2011 crime drama films
2011 films